Queen Hyeondeok (Hangul: 현덕왕후 권씨, Hanja: 顯德王后 權氏; 17 April 1418 – 10 August 1441), of the Andong Gwon clan, was the primary consort of Crown Prince Yi Hyang. She died giving birth to the future Danjong of Joseon and was posthumously honoured as Queen Hyeondeok (현덕왕후) in 1450, later demoted by Sejo of Joseon after he deposed her son, then restored by Jungjong of Joseon.

Biography
Lady Gwon was born on 17 April 1418 into the Andong Gwon clan to Gwon Jeon and his wife, Choi Ah-Ji, Lady Choi of the Haeju Choi clan. She had five younger siblings.

At the age of 12-13, Lady Gwon entered the palace in 1431 alongside two other girls, Lady Jeong of the Dongrae Jeong clan and Lady Hong of the Namyang Hong clan. All were granted Seunghwi; the 4th junior rank of the crown prince’s concubine. She gave birth to a daughter in 1433, but she died before she reached the age of one.

In 1435, Consort Gwon became pregnant, which drew the jealously of Crown Princess Sun, who had no children and feared that she would be removed in favor of Gwon. She later gave birth to Princess Gyeonghye in 1436. After Crown Princess Sun was banished for sleeping with her maid, Royal Consort Seunghwi was promoted to Yangwon (양원), the 3rd junior rank of concubine.

Soon after though, officials suggested that Kwon be made the next crown princess, as she already had a child, was older than Lady Hong, and her father's government position was high. She was made Crown Princess Gwon late in 1437.

On 9 August 1441, Crown Princess Gwon gave birth to a son named Yi Hong-wi, which was much celebrated, as he was the crown prince's only son. However, Gwon did not recover from the birth and died a day later. She was granted the posthumous title of Crown Princess Consort Hyeondeok (Hangul: 현덕빈, Hanja: 顯德嬪) and buried at Soreung in Ansan, Gyeonggi. It was said that her death had deeply saddened her husband and father-in-law, as well as those who lived and worked in the palace.

Sejong stated that the crown princess had graceful virtues and was admirable, compassionate, and dignified.

Posthumous status
When Munjong of Joseon ascended the throne, he granted his wife the title of Queen Hyeondeok. Her son later bestowed a full posthumous name during his reign.

In 1457, several years after her brother-in-law Sejo of Joseon had deposed her son as king, Queen Hyeondeok's brother and his mother-in-law were found guilty of treason and executed. Both the queen and her father were posthumously demoted to commoner status. 

In a book of unofficial history, Yeonryeosilkisul, it was said that King Sejo had felt the revenge of the deceased Queen Hyeondeok. ‘One day, Sejo had a dream of Queen Hyeondeok, who appeared in full wrath and said, “You killed my son who did nothing wrong, so I will do the same to your children. Remember that.” Sejo woke up in shock and suddenly, he received the news that the Crown Prince (Sejo’s firstborn son Crown Prince Uigyeong) had passed away. Because of that reason, Soreung (Queen Hyeondeok’s tomb) was dug up.’

Her status was later restored during King Jungjong’s reign and her remains were moved to Hyeonreung to be buried alongside Munjong of Joseon.

Family
 Great-Grandfather 
 Gwon Jeong-jung (권정중, 權正中)
 Grandfather
 Gwon Baek-jong (권백종, 權伯宗)
 Grandmother
 Lady Gwon (증 정경부인 권씨, 贈 貞敬夫人 權氏) (? - 1425)
Father
 Kwon Jeon (권전, 權專) (1371 - 1441)
Mother
 Choi Ah-ji (최아지, 崔阿只), Internal Princess Consort Haeryeong of the Haeju Choi clan (해령부부인 해주 최씨, 海寧府夫人 海州 崔氏) (? - 1456)
 Grandfather - Choi Yong (최용, 崔鄘)
 Grandmother - Lady Ji of the Chungju Ji clan (충주 지씨, 忠州 池氏)
 Siblings
Younger brother - Gwon Ja-shin (권자신, 權自愼) (? - 1456)
 Sister-in-law - Lady Kim (김씨)
 Younger sister - Lady Gwon of the Andong Gwon clan (안동 권씨, 安東 權氏)
 Brother-in-law - Kim Yeong-myeong (김영명, 金永命)
 Younger sister - Lady Gwon of the Andong Gwon clan (안동 권씨, 安東 權氏)
 Brother-in-law - Jo Cheong-no (조청노, 趙淸老)
 Younger sister - Lady Gwon of the Andong Gwon clan (안동 권씨, 安東 權氏)
 Brother-in-law - Gwon San-hae (권산해, 權山海)
 Younger sister - Lady Gwon of the Andong Gwon clan (안동 권씨, 安東 權氏)
 Brother-in-law - Yun Yeong-son (윤영손, 尹令孫)
 Husband
 King Munjong of Joseon (조선 문종) (15 November 1414 - 1 June 1452)
 Mother-in-law - Queen Soheon of the Cheongsong Sim clan (소헌왕후 심씨) (12 October 1395 - 19 April 1446)
 Father-in-law - Yi Do, King Sejong (조선 세종) (7 May 1397 - 30 March 1450)
 Children
 Unnamed daughter (1433 - 1433)
 Daughter - Princess Gyeonghye (경혜공주) (1436 - 17 January 1474)
 Son-in-law - Jeong Jong (정종, 鄭悰) (? - 1461)
 Granddaughter - Lady Jeong of the Haeju Jeong clan (해주 정씨, 海州 鄭氏); died prematurely 
 Grandson - Jeong Mi-su (정미수, 鄭眉壽) (1456 - 1512)
 Son - King Danjong of Joseon (조선 단종) (9 August 1441 - 7 November 1457)
 Daughter-in-law - Queen Jeongsun of the Yeosan Song clan (정순왕후 송씨) (1440 - 7 July 1521)

In popular culture
 Portrayed by Kang Hye-in in the 2008 KBS TV series The Great King Sejong.

References

Notes

Works cited

External links
 Inscription on King Munjong's Tomb at Hyeonreung

15th-century Korean people
1418 births
1441 deaths
15th-century Korean women
Royal consorts of the Joseon dynasty
Korean queens consort
Gwon clan of Andong
Deaths in childbirth
People from Hongseong County